A pandemic is a global epidemic or disease outbreak.

Pandemic may also refer to:

Disease outbreaks
List of epidemics (includes pandemics), for a particular one
COVID-19 pandemic, the ongoing global outbreak of coronavirus disease 2019

Literature
Pandemic (Cook novel), a 2018 medical thriller
Pandemic (Sigler novel), the 2014 finale of the Infected sci-fi trilogy
Pandemic!, a 2020 political philosophy book by Slavoj Žižek

Television
Pandemic (miniseries), a 2007 Hallmark Channel miniseries
"Pandemic", a two-episode South Park story arc first broadcast in 2008 during the twelfth season 
"Pandemic" (South Park), part one
"Pandemic 2: The Startling", part two
Pandemic: How to Prevent an Outbreak, a 2020 Netflix documentary series

Other media
Pandemic (album), a 2020 rap release by Comethazine
Pandemic (board game), a 2008 co-op strategy game
Pandemic (comics), a character in Marvel's X-Men: Endangered Species
Pandemic (film), a 2016 American zombie film
Pandemic Studios, a defunct video games developer

See also

First pandemic (disambiguation)
Second pandemic (disambiguation)
Third pandemic (disambiguation)
Fourth pandemic of cholera
Fifth pandemic of cholera
Sixth pandemic of cholera
Seventh pandemic of cholera
Pandemia, a 2006 novel
Plandemic, a pair of 2020 conspiracy videos
Endemic (epidemiology)
Epidemic (disambiguation)